This page serves as an index of lists of United States Supreme Court cases. The United States Supreme Court is the highest federal court of the United States.

By Chief Justice 
Court historians and other legal scholars consider each Chief Justice of the United States who presides over the Supreme Court of the United States to be the head of an era of the Court. These lists are sorted chronologically by Chief Justice and include most major cases decided by the Court.
 Jay, Rutledge, and Ellsworth Courts (October 19, 1789 – December 15, 1800)

 Marshall Court (February 4, 1801 – July 6, 1835)
 Taney Court (March 28, 1836 – October 12, 1864)
 Chase Court (December 15, 1864 – May 7, 1873)
 Waite Court (March 4, 1874 – March 23, 1888)
 Fuller Court (October 8, 1888 – July 4, 1910)
 White Court (December 19, 1910 – May 19, 1921)
 Taft Court (July 11, 1921 – February 3, 1930)
 Hughes Court (February 24, 1930 – June 30, 1941)
 Stone Court (July 3, 1941 – April 22, 1946)
 Vinson Court (June 24, 1946 – September 8, 1953)
 Warren Court (October 5, 1953 – June 23, 1969)
 Burger Court (June 23, 1969 – September 26, 1986)
 Rehnquist Court (September 26, 1986 – September 3, 2005)
 Roberts Court (September 29, 2005, to the present)

By volume 

Decisions of the Supreme Court of the United States are officially published in the United States Reports.

 Lists of United States Supreme Court cases by volume.

By term (since 1999)
These lists contain detailed tables about each term, including which Justices filed the Court's opinion, dissenting and concurring opinions in each case, and information about Justices joining opinions. The tables conclude with term statistics and concordance data.

 1999 term opinions
 2000 term opinions
 2001 term opinions
 2002 term opinions
 2003 term opinions
 2004 term opinions
 2005 term opinions
 2006 term opinions
 2007 term opinions
 2008 term opinions
 2009 term opinions
 2010 term opinions
 2011 term opinions
 2012 term opinions
 2013 term opinions
 2014 term opinions
 2015 term opinions
 2016 term opinions
 2017 term opinions
 2018 term opinions
 2019 term opinions
 2020 term opinions
 2021 term opinions
 2022 term opinions

By subject matter 
 Arbitration
 Capital punishment
 Copyright
 First Amendment
 Immigration
 Jehovah's Witnesses
 Legal standing
 LGBTQ rights
 Mental health
 Native American tribes
 Patents
 Taxation and revenue
 Trademarks

Other lists 
 List of pending United States Supreme Court cases
 List of landmark court decisions in the United States (most frequently from the Supreme Court)

See also

 List of United States courts of appeals cases
 List of United States state supreme court cases
 List of sources of law in the United States

References

External links 

 Opinions of the Supreme Court of the United States at supremecourt.gov

 
United States Supreme Court
United States Supreme Court cases